Anjanibai Malpekar (22 April 1883 – 7 August 1974) was a noted Indian classical singer, belonging to the Bhendibazaar gharana of Hindustani classical music.

In 1958, she became the first woman to be awarded the Sangeet Natak Akademi Fellowship, the highest honour conferred by the Sangeet Natak Akademi, India's National Academy for Music, Dance and Drama.

Acclaimed for her beauty in her youth, Malpekar was the muse of painters Raja Ravi Varma and M. V. Dhurandhar.

Early life and background
Malpekar was born on 22 April 1883, in Malpe, Pernem in Goa, in music loving family that belonged to Goan Kalavant community. Both her grandmother Gujabai and mother Nabubai were respected names in music circles. At young age of 8, she started her musical training under the tutelage of Ustad Nazeer Khan of Bhendibazaar gharana. The gharana had its origins in the much older Moradabad gharana, and was based in the Bhendi Bazaar area of Mumbai.

Career

Malpekar gave her debut performance at a concert in Mumbai in 1899, at the age of 16. In those days, women of "respectable families" never sang in public, while Malepakar went on to have a flourishing singing career, with both public and royal patronage. In time, she became the doyenne of the gharana.

Besides her singing, she also got acclaim for her beauty. When painter M. V. Dhurandhar did an oil painting of her, another painter Raja Ravi Varma was inspired, and went to do a series of paintings with her as muse, including "Lady in the Moonlight", "Lady Playing Swarbat", "Mohini" and "The Heartbroken", She modelled for him during his stay in Mumbai in 1901 and 1903. However this wasn't without its drawback, especially when singing in public concerts meant singing primarily to a male audience, this often led to harassment. Thus in 1904, she even developed fear of singing in public, and lost her voice, though she regained it after a year.

Meanwhile, she married Seth Wasanji Ved. After a successful career as a singer, after the death of her Guru Ustad Nazeer Khan in 1920, she lost interest in concerts. Finally, after a last performance at Town Hall, Mumbai, she gave up her public singing career in 1923. Thus at age 40, she decided to devote the rest of her years, to teaching music. In the coming decades, she taught some notable names in Indian classical music, including Kumar Gandharva who was her first disciple, Kishori Amonkar, Pandit T.D. Janorikar (1921–2006), Begum Akhtar and Naina Devi. By the 1960s, Bhendibazar gharana based in Mumbai, became famous all over India, with number of popular musicians, besides Aman Ali Khan, it had Jhande Khan, Mamman Khan, Shabbir and Amir Khan.

In 1958, when for her contribution to music, she was awarded the Sangeet Natak Akademi Fellowship the highest honour conferred by Sangeet Natak Akademi, India's National Academy for Music, Dance and Drama, she became the first woman to receive the award.

She died on 7 August 1974 in Bombay (now Mumbai), at the age of 91.

Gallery

References

External links

 Anjanibai Malpekar Biography and Audio Vijaya Parrikar Library of Indian Classical Music

1883 births
1974 deaths
Hindustani singers
Indian women classical singers
People from North Goa district
Recipients of the Sangeet Natak Akademi Fellowship
Singers from Mumbai
Indian music educators
20th-century Indian singers
19th-century Indian singers
Women educators from Goa
20th-century Indian educators
Singers from Goa
Women Hindustani musicians
20th-century Indian women singers
19th-century Indian educators
19th-century Indian women singers
Educators from Goa
Women musicians from Goa
Women music educators
19th-century women educators
20th-century women educators
Singers from British India